Jonathan Scott (sometimes credited as Jonathan R. Scott; born 1973) is an English former child actor most notable for his appearance as Edmund Pevensie in three of the BBC's four adaptations of the Narnia books between 1988 and 1990.  He appeared in The Lion, the Witch and the Wardrobe in 1988 as well as Prince Caspian and The Voyage of the Dawn Treader in 1989.

Scott gave up acting in his late teens, his last role being in a 1993 episode of The Bill.

References

External links

English male television actors
English male child actors
Living people
1973 births